Ernocornutia carycodes is a species of moth of the family Tortricidae. It is found in Colombia (Mount Tolima).

References

Moths described in 1926
Euliini